Hesperomeles obtusifolia is a species of plant native to South America. It is cultivated as an ornamental plant. The fruits of this species are edible, eaten freshly picked from the tree.

References

External links
 Plants for a future

Maleae